Rwanda competed at the 1988 Summer Olympics in Seoul, South Korea.

Competitors
The following is the list of number of competitors in the Games.

Athletics

Men
Track & road events

Women
Track & road events

References

Official Olympic Reports
sports-reference

Nations at the 1988 Summer Olympics
1988
1988 in Rwanda